Boorooma is a suburb of Wagga Wagga, New South Wales, Australia, located in the city's north, beyond the floodplains of the Murrumbidgee River. The locality is a southern neighbour of Charles Sturt University—which in fact is referred to as 'Boorooma Campus' and is located directly to the east of the suburb of Estella and to the north of the Olympic Highway. Boorooma is progressively undergoing transition from rural residential type allotments to more intensive urban residential uses. Boorooma is also home to Vianney College Seminary and The Riverina Anglican College, and has land zoned for a future shopping centre.

Streets in Boorooma are named after 'Notable Australian Sporting Identities', such as Messenger Ave after Dally Messenger and Bradman Drive for Don Bradman.

External links

References

Suburbs of Wagga Wagga